The Přemyslid dynasty or House of Přemyslid was a Bohemian royal dynasty that reigned in the Duchy of Bohemia and later Kingdom of Bohemia and Margraviate of Moravia (9th century–1306), as well as in parts of Poland (including Silesia), Hungary and Austria.

Origin and growth of the Přemyslid dynasty
The dynasty's origin dates back to the 9th century, when the Přemyslids ruled a tiny territory around Prague, populated by a tribe of the Western Slavs. Gradually they expanded, conquering much of the region of Bohemia, located in the Bohemian basin where it was not threatened by the expansion of the Frankish Empire. The first historically-documented Přemyslid duke was Bořivoj I (867). In the following century, the Přemyslids also ruled over Silesia and founded the city of Wroclaw (Czech: Vratislav; German: Breslau), derived from the name of a Bohemian duke, Vratislaus I, father of Saint Wenceslaus. Under the reign of Prince Boleslaus I the Cruel (935) and his son Boleslaus II the Pious (972), the Přemyslids ruled territory stretching to today's Belarus.

The dynasty controlled vital trade routes during this time. The Bohemian lands and Prague were an important center of trade where merchants from all of Europe settled, including many Jews, as recalled in 965 by the Hispano-Jewish merchant and traveller Ibrahim ibn Ya'qub. He wrote, "Prague is a city from the stone, the richest of all states north of the Alps." After their rise to prominence, however, struggles within the family set in motion a decline in power and, in 1002, the Polish duke Boleslaus the Brave occupied Prague. Boleslaus III, son of Boleslaus II, escaped from Bohemia; decades of confusion and anarchy ensued.

The decline ended in the reign of Prince Bretislaus I, grandson of Boleslaus II. He in turn looted Poland, including the cities of Krakow and Gniezno (1038), where he obtained the relics of St. Adalbert. He sought the establishment of the Prague archbishopric and a royal title. His son and successor Vratislaus II became the first King of Bohemia in 1085.

Vratislav's son Sobeslaus I destroyed the Imperial army of King Lothar III in the Battle of Chlumec in 1126. This allowed a further strengthening of Bohemia, culminating during the reign of Vratislav's grandson, King Vladislaus II (1158). Vladislav II founded many monasteries and built the first stone bridge across the Vltava river, one of the earliest in Central and Northern Europe. Once again, internal struggles started the decline of the Přemyslids. Many leaders from the dynasty alternated on the Bohemian throne, leading to their eventual bankruptcy. Finally, on his ascension to the throne, Ottokar I began a series of changes that brought Bohemia out of crisis, and began a period of success that lasted for nearly 220 years.

At the height of its power

Ottokar I became the third King of Bohemia in the year 1198 but was the first King of Bohemia to acquire a hereditary royal title. This began significant growth of the Přemyslids' dynastic power. There was also a large urban and crafts development in Bohemia.

In the second half of the 13th century, the Přemyslids were one of the most powerful dynasties in Central Europe. King Přemysl Ottokar II, son of Wenceslas I, earned the nickname "Iron and Golden King" because of his military power and wealth. After several victorious wars with the Hungarian Kingdom, he acquired Austria, Styria, Carinthia and Carniola, extending Bohemian territory to the Adriatic Sea.

King Ottokar II aspired to the crown of the Holy Roman Empire. His ambitions started the conflict with the House of Habsburg, which had been composed of little-known counts, and suited the interests of German noble houses better than the mighty King Ottokar. The Habsburg representative, Rudolf, was elected as King of the Romans. In the Battle of Marchfeld (1278), Ottokar clashed with the Imperial and Hungarian armies, only to be killed. The Habsburgs then acquired Austria and retained it until the 20th century.

Ottokar's son King Wenceslaus II was just seven when he came to the throne of Bohemia. Over time, thanks to deft diplomacy, he gained the Polish crown for himself and the crown of Hungary for his son. Wenceslas II brought together a vast empire stretching from the Baltic Sea to the Danube River and established numerous cities, among them Plzeň in 1295. Bohemia became a wealthy nation during his reign thanks to a large vein of silver at Kutná Hora. He introduced the silver Prague groschen, which was an important unit of currency in Europe for centuries, and planned to build the first university in Central Europe.

The power and wealth of the Kingdom of Bohemia gave rise to great respect, but also to the hostility of other European royal families. The dynasty began to collapse following the untimely death of Wenceslaus II (1305), and the assassination of his only son, Wenceslaus III in 1306, which ended their rule.

On the distaff side, however, the dynasty continued, and in 1355, Bohemian king Charles IV, the grandson of Wenceslaus II, was crowned Holy Roman Emperor in Rome.

Legendary rulers
The name of the dynasty, according to Cosmas in his Chronica Boemorum (1119), comes from its legendary founder, Přemysl, husband of duchess Libuše.

Přemysl and Libuše
Nezamysl
Mnata
Vojen
Vnislav
Křesomysl
Neklan
Hostivít

Dukes of Bohemia
The first historical Přemyslid was Duke Bořivoj I, baptised in 874 by Saint Methodius. In 895, Bohemia gained independence from Great Moravia. Between 1003 and 1004, Bohemia was controlled by Boleslaus the Brave, Duke of Poland from the Piast dynasty, grandson of Boleslaus I the Cruel.

In 1085, Duke Vratislaus II, and, in 1158, Duke Vladislaus II, were crowned King of Bohemia as a personal award from the Holy Roman Emperor. The title, however, was not hereditary.

Bořivoj I (c.870–889)
Spytihněv I (895–915)
Vratislaus I (915–921)
Saint Wenceslaus (Wenceslaus I, Duke of Bohemia) (921–935)
Boleslaus I the Cruel (935–972)
Boleslaus II the Pious (972–999)
Boleslaus III the Red-haired (999–1002)
Vladivoj (1002–1003)
Boleslaus IV (1003–1004)
Jaromír (1004–1012)
Ulrich (1012–1033)
Jaromír (1033–1034)
Ulrich (1034)
Bretislaus I (1035–1055)
Spytihněv II (1055–1061)
Vratislaus II (1061–1092), king (1085–1092) as Vratislav I.
Conrad I of Brno (1092)
Bretislaus II (1092–1100)
Bořivoj II (1101–1107)
Svatopluk (1107–1109)
Vladislaus I (1109–1117)
Bořivoj II (1117–1120)
Vladislaus I (1120–1125)
Sobeslaus I (1125–1140)
Vladislaus II (1140–1172), king (1158–1172) as Vladislaus I
Frederick (1172–1173)
Sobeslaus II (1173–1178)
Frederick (1178–1189)
Conrad II Otto (1189–1191)
Wenceslaus II (1191–1192)
Ottokar I (1192–1193)
Henry Bretislaus (1193–1197)
Vladislaus Henry (1197)
Ottokar I (1197–1198)

Kings of Bohemia

Bohemia was the only princedom in the Holy Roman Empire which was raised to the status of kingdom prior to the Napoleonic wars. The reason for this was strength: as soon as Bohemia overcame its civil strife, the Bohemian duke became the principal ally for any candidate for the Imperial throne. The emperor could thus use Bohemian forces to punish any rebels who were Bohemian neighbours simply by raiding their lands. This is evinced by the Holy Roman Emperor Henry IV naming Prince Vratislaus II of Bohemia the first king of Bohemia, Vratislav I, in 1085. He was raised to this prominent position not long after his father Bretislaus pacified Bohemia after years of civil conflict. The kingship was disputed whenever Bohemian internal conflict increased. It was fixed, however, after the position of the emperor in Germany weakened.

In 1198, Duke Ottokar I again gained the title of King of Bohemia as an ally of Philip of Swabia. This title was reconfirmed by Otto IV, Holy Roman Emperor and later on in Frederick II, Holy Roman Emperor's Golden Bull of Sicily (1212).

Ottokar I (czech Přemysl Otakar I.) (1198–1230)
Wenceslaus I (czech Václav I.) (1230–1253)
Ottokar II (czech Přemysl Otakar II.) (1253–1278)
Wenceslaus II (czech Václav II.) (1278–1305)
Wenceslaus III (czech Václav III.) (1305–1306)

Kings of Bohemia, Poland and Hungary, rulers of Austria

In 1269-1276, King Ottokar II of Bohemia was the first in history to rule the lands of today's Austria together (except for Tyrol and Salzburg). He also founded the Hofburg Palace in Vienna.

In 1300, King Wenceslaus II was crowned King of Poland. Prior to this, he held the title "High Duke of Poland (Duke of Kraków)" since 1291 and became its overlord upon the death of Przemysł II of Poland in 1296.

Wenceslaus II (1300–1305)
Wenceslaus III (1305–1306), also King of Hungary (1301–1305) as Vencel

The royal line ended in 1306 with the death of King Wenceslaus III. The Bohemian throne went to the Luxembourgs, and the Polish throne returned to the Piasts.

Dukes of Opava, Krnov, Ratibor and Münsterberg
In 1269, Nicholas, bastard son of King Ottokar II who was legitimized by pope Alexander IV in 1260, became Duke of Opava. In 1337, his son Nicholas II inherited the Duchy of Ratibor. His four sons divided the Duchy of Opava (the Duchy of Ratibor was inherited only by the eldest, John). Thus started the partition of a once-unified land between the descendants of Nicholas II. In 1443, William, Duke of Opava gained the Duchy of Münsterberg, which was held by Přemyslids until 1456. This line of Opavian Přemyslids ended in 1521, with the death of Valentine, Duke of Ratibor.

Family tree
Family Tree of the Premyslid Dukes and Kings of Bohemia

Bořivoj I. + Saint Ludmila
 Spytihněv I
 Vratislav I
 Saint Václav I
 Boleslav I the Cruel
 Boleslav II the Pious
 Boleslav III the Red-haired
 Jaromír the Eunuch
 Václav the Infantdead
 Oldřich
 Břetislav I Achilles (Duke of Bohemia and Moravia, earlier Duke of Moravia - Bretislian)
 Spytihněv II
 Vratislav II
 Břetislav II
 Judith of Bohemia, mother of Boleslaus III of Poland
 Bořivoj II
 Vladislav I
 Vladislav II
 Bedřich
 Ottokar I
 Wenceslas I
 Ottokar II the Golden and Iron
 Wenceslas II
 Wenceslas III d. 1306 as last male member of the royal Přemyslid dynasty
 Anne of Bohemia (1290–1313)
 Elisabeth of Bohemia (1292–1330) last member of the royal Přemyslid dynasty
 Nicholas I of Opavia started line of Dukes of Opava; died out in 1521
 Vladislaus II of Moravia (Ottonian)
 Queen Dagmar of Denmark, mother of Valdemar the Young
 Vladislav III Henry
 Henry
 Břetislav III Henry (Henry Bretislav)
 Soběslav I
 Soběslav II. the Peasant
 Wenceslas II
 Bishop Jaromír
 Konrád I of Brno and Znojmo (Conradian)
 Konrád of Brno (Conradian, earlier Duke of Moravia)
 Litolt of Znojmo (Conradian, earlier Duke of Moravia)
 Oldřich of Brno (Cobradian, Duke of Moravia, part of Brno)
 Konrád of Znojmo (Conradian, earlier Duke of Moravia)
 Konrád II Ota of Brno and Znojmo (Conradian)
 Otto of Olomouc
 Otto II the Black
 Svatopluk
 Abbess Mlada
 Dobrava m. Mieszko I of Poland, ancestors of piast line in Poland, which includes Boleslaw III above
 Strachkvas Christian

Family tree of Elisabeth of Bohemia and Jagiellonians and Habsburgs
 Charles IV, Holy Roman Emperor and king of Bohemia
 Wenceslaus, King of the Romans and king of Bohemia
 Sigismund, Holy Roman Emperor King of Hungary and Bohemia
 Elisabeth of Luxemburg Queen of Hungary, Germany and Bohemia
 Ladislaus the Posthumous King of Hungary and Bohemia, Archduke of Austria
 Elisabeth of Austria Queen of Poland
 King Vladislas II of Bohemia and Hungary
 King Louis II of Hungary and of Bohemia
 Princess and Queen Anna of Bohemia and Hungary + Ferdinand I, Holy Roman Emperor and King of Hungary and Bohemia
 Maxmilian II
 Rudolph II
 Matthias
 Charles of Steiermark
 Ferdinand II
 Ferdinand III
 Ferdinand IV
 Leopold I
 Joseph I
 Marie Amalia + Charles III of Bavaria
 Charles II
 Maria Theresa
 Joseph II
 Leopold II
 Francis I
 Ferdinand V
 Francis Charles
 Francis II Joseph
 Emperor Maxmilian
 Charles Louis
 Francis Ferdinand d'Este
 Otto
 Charles IV
 Otto von Habsburg
 Karl von Habsburg
John of Zgorzelec
Elisabeth, Duchess of Luxembourg
John Henry
Emperor Jost of Moravia

See also
List of rulers of Bohemia
Kingdom of Bohemia
List of Polish rulers
List of rulers of Hungary

References

 
Medieval royal families
History of Poland during the Piast dynasty
1306 disestablishments
Dynasty genealogy
European dynasties